Flechtner is a German language occupational surname and may refer to:
Arthur Philipp Flechtner (1858–1936), German military leader
Michael Flechtner (born 1951), American artist
Thomas Flechtner (1961), Swiss photographer

German-language surnames
Occupational surnames